This article lists the major power stations located in Hunan province.

Non-renewable

Coal based

Renewable

Hydroelectric

Conventional

Pumped-storage

References 

Power stations
Hunan